Belgium competed at the 2012 Summer Paralympics in London, United Kingdom from August 29 to September 9, 2012.

Athletics 

Men

Women

Boccia

Cycling

Road

Track 
Time Trial

Pursuit

Equestrian 

Individual

Team

Goalball

Men's tournament

Group B

Quarter-final

Swimming

Men

Women

Table tennis

Men

Wheelchair rugby 

Group stage

5th–8th place semi-finals

Wheelchair tennis

References

Nations at the 2012 Summer Paralympics
2012
Summer Paralympics